In Euclidean geometry, the Droz-Farny line theorem is a property of two perpendicular lines through the orthocenter of an arbitrary triangle.

Let  and  be any two mutually perpendicular lines through .

The theorem was stated by Arnold Droz-Farny in 1899, but it is not clear whether he had a proof.

Goormaghtigh's generalization
A generalization of the Droz-Farny line theorem was proved in 1930 by René Goormaghtigh.

The Droz-Farny line theorem is a special case of this result, when  is the orthocenter of triangle .

Dao's generalization 
The theorem was further generalized by Dao Thanh Oai. The generalization as follows:

First generalization: Let ABC be a triangle, P be a point on the plane, let three parallel segments AA', BB', CC' such that its midpoints and P are collinear. Then PA', PB', PC' meet BC, CA, AB respectively at three collinear points.

 

Second generalization: Let a conic S and a point P  on the plane. Construct three lines  da, db, dc through P such that they meet the conic at A, A';   B, B'  ;  C, C' respectively. Let D  be a point on the polar of point P with respect to (S) or D lies on the conic (S). Let DA' ∩ BC =A0; DB' ∩ AC = B0; DC' ∩ AB= C0. Then A0, B0, C0  are collinear.

References 
 

Euclidean geometry
Conic sections
Theorems about triangles